The Quiniluban Group is a group of islands in Palawan Province of the Philippines situated between the islands of Palawan and Panay in the Sulu Sea. The group is the northernmost in the Cuyo Archipelago, consisting of several islands and rocks. The largest of the circular group is Quiniluban Island.

These mostly hilly islands are of limestone formation, have no permanent streams, and very little wood, but are covered with tall grass. Most of its inhabitants live along the coast, and there is some cultivation on the larger islands.

Islands

From northerly directions it appears as a sharp cone. From easterly directions it appears as a ridge with a dome-shaped elevation in the center. It has the reddish-brown color of cogon regions and makes a prominent landmark. Most of the inhabitants of the island live on its western and southern coast.
Calumpin Island, is one of the three small islands located between Quiniluban and Alcisiras Islands.
Yanuta Island, also known as Nianuta Island, is a small inhabited island between Quiniluban and Alcisiras Islands.
Arorunga, also known as Ararungua Island, is a small inhabited island located between Alcisiras and Quiniluban.
Two small rocky island
Cambug Rock lie on the northwestern part of the reef.
Two smaller uninhabited rocky islets as located north and northeast of Maligun Island.
Most of its inhabitants live in the tail-like southern section of the island.
Tinitiuan Island,     

Henalubatan Rock is a small uninhabited rocky islet  eastward of the easternmost tip of Quiniluban Island.
Pamalican Island, 7 miles southwestward of Quiniluban Island, is low, covered with a scrub growth. The island is surrounded by a coral reef which extends about 1 mile off the northeast side.
Manamoc Island lies about 3 miles southwest of Pamalican. It is  -old high, roughly circular in form, about 1 ¾ miles in diameter, and surrounded by a wide coral reef partly bare at low water. A break in the reef permits the shallow draft native boats to enter the lagoon in the southwestern part of the island. This lagoon has about 3 feet of water at low tide.

See also

 List of islands of the Philippines

References

Cuyo Archipelago